Herschbroich is a municipality in the district of Ahrweiler, in Rhineland-Palatinate, Germany.

It lies within the original Nürburgring racing circuit.

References

Populated places in Ahrweiler (district)